Pirates Press is a vinyl manufacturing and production located in Emeryville, California, that was founded in 2004. The company was started in the bedroom of owner Eric Mueller and has grown into a full-scale operation that now includes offices in Emeryville, California, New Jersey, and Czech Republic. It is the manufacturing and production wing of its sister company Pirates Press Records.

Company history 
Pirates Press was founded in 2004 by Eric “Skippy” Mueller in San Francisco, California. Mueller started Pirates Press with the intent to ‘protect independent labels, bands, artists and businesses from being swindled and handicapped by big corporate manufacturers who really don’t care about them.’”
The company has seen 75-100% yearly growth since its inception. In 2005, Pirates Press produced about 250,000 vinyl. In 2008, the company produced around 1.75 million vinyl for its customers. In 2009, Pirates Press produced over 2 million records for its customers. Clients include Tom Petty, White Stripes, Beck, Slayer, Eric Clapton, Madonna, and more.

The company is one of only a few remaining vinyl pressers in the United States.
Pirates Press has also brought back the manufacturing of flexi disc which are done on-site at the company’s warehouse. Pirates Press uses the world's oldest vinyl manufacturing plant where each record is pressed on a manual machine whereas the US plants use suction-cup machines. This traditional pressing style allows employees to "...concoct original color compounds and press records by hand. This means customers have access to just about anything they can dream up, from orange marble to translucent red; solid white to half-purple and half-green; even glitter and glow-in-the-dark." Pirates Press' engineers have created a technology that can digitally recreate a record before it is cut to analyze what the grooves would look like with different input settings or a different version of the master. Product is pressed by GZ Media in the Czech Republic.

References

External links 
 

Recorded music
Manufacturing companies based in California
Companies based in San Francisco
2004 establishments in California
Music of the San Francisco Bay Area
Flexi discs